Some Attributes of a Living System is the second studio album by the free improvisation ensemble Mnemonist Orchestra, released in 1980 by Dys Records.

Track listing

Personnel 
Adapted from the Some Attributes of a Living System liner notes.

Mnemonists
 Mark Derbyshire – tape, electronics, engineering
 John Herdt – electric guitar, spoken word
 Torger Hougen – spoken word, percussion
 Hugh Ragin – trumpet, trombone, piccolo, percussion
 Steve Scholbe – alto saxophone, electric guitar, percussion, spoken word, arrangements (A10)
 William Sharp – piano, tape, electronics, percussion, spoken word, production, arrangements (A1, A2, A4, A5, A7, A10, A12, A13, B2, B3, B5–B9)
 Sara Thompson – double bass
 Randy Yeates – spoken word, percussion

Additional musicians
 Steve Bennett – acoustic guitar and electric guitar (A10, A13, B5)
 Renais Goddard – spoken word (B8)
 Kent Hotchkiss – spoken word (A2)
 Ruth Hougen – harp (B7)
 Melissa Katsimpalis – spoken word (A9, B8)
 Tom Katsimpalis – percussion, acoustic guitar (A1), spoken word (A9)
 Ken Lark – percussion, spoken word, drums (A4, A5)
 Mark Schulz – bass guitar (A4, A5, B7)

Release history

References

External links 
 Some Attributes of a Living System at Discogs (list of releases)

1980 albums
Biota (band) albums